Dawes is a lunar impact crater located in the wide straight between Mare Serenitatis and Mare Tranquilitatis. To its southwest lies the larger crater Plinius, and to its northeast sits the Mons Argaeus mountain rise. It is named after British astronomer William Rutter Dawes.

Description
Dawes is circular with a sharp rim that has a slightly flattened oval perimeter. It has a slight central rise, and a somewhat darker floor that is nearly covered in overlapping swirl-like deposits. Much of the deposits are slumped or fall-back material. The inner walls are steep and free from impact erosion.  Northeast of Dawes is a rille known as Rima Dawes.

Detailed examination of this crater has located what appear to be alcoves and channels along the inner rim. It is hypothesized that micrometeorite impacts along the rim trigger dry landslides, which produce a gully-like appearance. A similar phenomenon may be responsible for gully-like features along the inner rim of some Martian craters.

References

External links

 High resolution view from Apollo 15 (Figure 144 of Apollo Over the Moon: A View from Orbit (online version) (NASA SP-362), 1978)
 Lunar Orbiter 5 image 070, L&PI
 LTO-42C3 Dawes — L&PI topographic map
 LROC page: Dawes

Related article
 

Impact craters on the Moon